Stegastes partitus or the bicolor damselfish is a species of bony fish in the family Pomacentridae found near the sea bed on shallow rocky and coral reefs in the Caribbean Sea, the Gulf of Mexico and off the coasts of Florida.

Description

The head and the front half of the body are dark grey or black and the rear half is pale, usually with some yellow, with regional variations in the coloring. The large dorsal fin has 12 spines and 14-17 soft rays. The anal fin is also large and has two spines and 13-15 soft rays.

Behaviour
Unlike most other members of the genus Stegastes which eat filamentous algae, the bicolor damselfish feeds on plankton. It forms loose groups of up to twenty individuals and defends a territory over a rocky reef with plenty of crevices in which to lurk.

References

External links
 

partitus
Fish described in 1868
Fish of the Atlantic Ocean